NMP could refer to:

Science
N-Methylpyrrolidone, an organic solvent
Nitroxide mediated radical polymerization, a method of controlled polymerization
The New Millennium Program, a spaceflight technology initiative at NASA
North Magnetic Pole of the Earth
Nucleoside monophosphate
 Non-Measured Point (in metrology)

Politics
New Middle Party, a Dutch political party
Newham Monitoring Project, an anti-racist organisation / political pressure group in England
Nominated Member of Parliament, a Member of the Parliament of Singapore who is appointed by the President
Net material product, statistical index used in the USSR as a substitute to GDP
NMP (political party), a defunct minor party in New Zealand

Others
NMP (Not My Problem), is a common abbreviation used as a response to email or memo messages, to flag that the previous message has been ignored
National Military Park, a protected area in the United States
Najświętsza Maria Panna, a Polish church dedication commonly abbreviated to NMP. Translates as "Our Virgin Mary".